The United States has signed the United Nations Convention on the Rights of the Child (UNCRC), however it remains the only United Nations member state to have not ratified it.

The UNCRC aims to protect and promote the rights of all children around the world. It was the first international treaty to integrate all human rights in reference to children, encouraging them to participate in family, cultural, and social aspects of life. It emphasizes the right to survival, development, and protection against abuse, neglect, and exploitation. It also addresses issues concerning education, health care, juvenile justice and the rights of children with disabilities.

Constitutional requirements
Under the United States Constitution, the ratification of treaties involves several steps. First, the president or his representative would negotiate, agree, and sign a treaty, which would then be submitted to the United States Senate for its "advice and consent". At that time the President would explain and interpret all provisions in the treaty. If the Senate approves the treaty with a two-thirds majority, it goes back to the President who can ratify it.

History and status
The United States government contributed to the drafting of the Convention. It commented on nearly all of the articles and proposed the original text of seven of them. Three of these come directly from the United States Constitution and were proposed by the administration of President Ronald Reagan. The Convention was adopted by the UN General Assembly on 20 November 1989 and came into effect on 2 September 1990.

On 16 February 1995, Madeleine Albright, at the time the United States Ambassador to the United Nations, signed the Convention. However, though generally supportive of the Convention, President Bill Clinton did not submit it to the Senate. Likewise, President Bush did not submit the Convention to the Senate. During his presidency, Barack Obama described the failure to ratify the Convention as "embarrassing," and promised to review this. The Obama administration said that it intended to submit the Convention to the Senate, but failed to do so. Throughout the entirety of Donald Trump's presidency, his administration did not submit the convention for Senate ratification either. The presidential administration of Joe Biden currently has yet to submit the Convention to the Senate.

States may, when ratifying the Convention, ratify subject to reservations or interpretations. Besides other obligations, ratification of the Convention would require the United States to submit reports, outlining its implementation on the domestic level, to the United Nations Committee on the Rights of the Child, a panel of child rights experts from around the world. Parties must report initially two years after acceding to (ratifying) the Convention and then every five years.

Support 
Many organizations in the United States support ratification of the Convention, including groups that work with children such as the Girl Scouts and Kiwanis.
The Campaign for U.S. Ratification of the Convention on the Rights of the Child argues that criticisms mentioned by opponents of the convention "are the result of misconceptions, erroneous information, and a lack of understanding about how international human rights treaties are implemented in the United States".

The Campaign for U.S. Ratification of the Convention on the Rights of the Child is a volunteer-driven network that includes attorneys, child and human rights advocates, educators, members of religious and faith-based communities, non-governmental organizations (NGOs), students and other concerned citizens. They help to promote the ratification of the UNCRC. This campaign began in 2002 and works through a National Steering Committee, campaign meetings, youth advisory council and special events with many different partners involved. Its campaign is guided by its mission statement: "Our mission is to bring about ratification and implementation of the CRC in the United States. We will achieve this through mobilizing our diverse network to educate communities on the Convention, thereby creating a groundswell of national support for the treaty, and by advocating directly with our government on behalf of ratification."

Opposition 
Opposition to ratification comes from some religious groups. These, along with many political conservatives, claim that the Convention conflicts with the United States Constitution because in the original language of the Constitution "treaties" referred only to international relations (military alliances, trade, etc.) and not domestic policies. This has apparently played a significant role in the non-ratification of the treaty so far. Senator Jesse Helms, the former chairman of the Senate Foreign Relations Committee, described it as a "bag of worms," an effort to "chip away at the U.S. Constitution."

Some Americans oppose the CRC with the reasoning that the nation already has in place everything the treaty espouses, and therefore it would make no practical difference.

Sovereignty and Federalism
Legal concerns over ratification have mostly focused on issues of sovereignty and federalism.  Meanwhile, the Supreme Court of the United States has held that to some significant degree, no government—federal, state, or local—may interfere with the parent-child relationship.
The Heritage Foundation sees the conflict as an issue of international control over domestic policy: "Although not originally promoted as an entity that would become involved in actively seeking to shape member states' domestic policies, the U.N. has become increasingly intrusive in these arenas. They express concern about "sovereign jurisdiction, over domestic policymaking" and "preserving the freedom of American Civil Society", and argue that the actual practice of some United Nations Committees has been to review national policies that are unrelated, or are marginally related to the actual language of the Convention.

However, as a "non-self-executing treaty", the convention does not grant any international body enforcement authority over the United States or its citizens, but merely obligates the United States federal government to submit periodic reports on how the provisions of the treaty are being met (or not). The sole enforcement mechanism within the Convention is the issuing of a written report.

Death penalty and life imprisonment
Article 37 of the Convention prohibits sentencing children under 18 years old to death or life imprisonment with no opportunity for parole. The United States does not comply with this article in its entirety.  Three successive Supreme Court decisions have moved toward compliance:
In 2005, 22 U.S. states allowed for the execution of juvenile offenders. This ceased after the 2005 Supreme Court decision Roper v. Simmons, which found juvenile execution unconstitutional as "cruel and unusual punishment". The decision cited the Convention as one of several indications that "the United States now stands alone in a world that has turned its face against the juvenile death penalty".
The 2010 decision Graham v. Florida prohibited the sentencing of juveniles to life imprisonment without the possibility of parole for non-homicide crimes. As of the Graham decision, six U.S. states prohibited such sentences in all cases.
The June 2012 Supreme Court decision Miller v. Alabama held that mandatory sentences of life without the possibility of parole are unconstitutional for juvenile murderers.  The ruling did not prohibit courts from imposing a considered life sentence.

Parental rights
Some supporters of homeschooling have expressed concern that the Convention will subvert the authority of parents.

One of the most controversial tenets of the Convention is the participatory rights granted to children. The Convention champions youth voice in new ways. Article 12 states:

David M. Smolin argues that Article 29 limits the fundamental right of parents and others to educate children in private school by requiring that all such schools support the principles contained in the United Nations Charter and a list of specific values and ideals.  He argues that "Supreme Court case law has provided that a combination of parental rights and religious liberties provide a broader right of parents and private schools to control the values and curriculum of private education free from State interference.

Smolin, otherwise a proponent who urges U.S. reservations to the convention, argues that Article 5, which includes a provision stating that parents "provide, in a manner consistent with the evolving capacities of the child, appropriate direction and guidance in the exercise by the child of the rights recognized in the present Convention", "is couched in language which seems to reduce the parental role to that of giving advice"., pages 81 & 90 The Campaign for U.S. Ratification of the Convention on the Rights of the Child argues that the Convention protects parental responsibility from government interference.

The Campaign for the U.S. Ratification of the CRC believes, instead, that the CRC does not outline any specific interference with school curricula, nor would ratification prevent parents from homeschooling their children.  In addition, the CRC recognizes the family "as the fundamental group of society and the natural environment for the growth and well-being of all its members and particularly children ..." (Preamble to the CRC) and repeatedly underscores the pivotal role parents play in their children's lives (Articles 3, 5, 7-10, 14, 18, 22, and 27.1).  Under the Convention, parental responsibility is protected from government interference.  Article 5 states that Governments should respect the rights, responsibilities, and duties of parents to raise their children.  There is no language in the CRC that dictates the manner in which parents are to raise and instruct their children.

Geraldine Van Bueren, the author of the principal textbook on the international rights of the child, and a participant in the drafting of the Convention, has described the "best interest of the child standard" in the treaty as "provid[ing] decision and policy makers with the authority to substitute their own decisions for either the child's or the parents' ";

Issues within parental rights
The treaty addresses parental discipline and discipline in schools. There is a concern that it will eliminate parents' right to discipline. The UNCRC does not specify what discipline can be used but calls on parents to provide guidance and direction to children instead of punishment. Educational discipline is addressed by eliminating mental or physical abuse and violence. Dress codes and singing the national anthem are not addressed and left to the school officials and governments to determine if either should be protected.
The age of children and their ability to understand the UNCRC and the rights they get also raise questions. Parents' decisions on how they address the UNCRC will help the development of children.  Parental guidance should help children evolve and teach them to respect their own and others' rights.
Another concern is whether or not the UNCRC will give the children more rights than parents. Parents still have control over their children; for example, they can expect children to help around the house. The Convention only prohibits work that is harmful to their health or interferes with education. This concern, however, seems to show a lack of awareness that children are more vulnerable than their adult parents and thus require special protection.

Other arguments
David Smolin argues that the objections from religious and political conservatives stem from their view that the U.N. is an elitist institution, which they do not trust to properly handle sensitive decisions regarding family issues.  He suggests that legitimate concerns of critics could be met with appropriate reservations by the U.S., page 110

See also 

 United States and the United Nations Convention on the Law of the Sea

References

Children's rights in the United States
History of the foreign relations of the United States
Convention on the Rights of the Child